Aljaž Sedej (born 30 May 1988) is a Slovenian judoka. He competed in the men's 81 kg event at the 2008 and 2012 Summer Olympics. At the 2008 Summer Olympics, he was defeated in the second round by Hamed Malekmohammadi.  At the 2012 Olympics he was eliminated in the second round by Travis Stevens.

References

External links
 
 

1988 births
Living people
Slovenian male judoka
Olympic judoka of Slovenia
Judoka at the 2008 Summer Olympics
Judoka at the 2012 Summer Olympics
Sportspeople from Ljubljana
Mediterranean Games gold medalists for Slovenia
Mediterranean Games silver medalists for Slovenia
Competitors at the 2009 Mediterranean Games
Competitors at the 2013 Mediterranean Games
Mediterranean Games medalists in judo
21st-century Slovenian people